Acacia sassa is a legume that grows in the forests of Senegal. It was first described by Carl Ludwig von Willdenow.  Smoke from certain parts of it is known to be psychoactive.

References 

sassa
Trees of Africa